Hurricane Creek is a stream in Ripley County in the U.S. state of Missouri. It is a tributary of the Current River.

Hurricane Creek was so named on account of a hurricane (tornado) which struck the area, according to local history.

See also
List of rivers of Missouri

References

Rivers of Ripley County, Missouri
Rivers of Missouri